Perica Bukić (born 20 February 1966) is a Croatian former professional water polo player and politician. He represented Yugoslavia at the 1984 and 1988 Summer Olympics.

Bukić was given the honour to carry the national flag of Croatia at the opening ceremony of the 1996 Summer Olympics in Atlanta, becoming the 17th water polo player to be a flag bearer at the opening and closing ceremonies of the Olympics.

Bukić was educated at the University of Zagreb, from which he received a degree in economics.

During his active water polo years, he played for Solaris Šibenik, 
Mladost Zagreb, and Jadran Split. He later became the sports director of "Mladost" Zagreb.

Bukić is a member of the Croatian Democratic Union. In the 2003 Croatian parliamentary election he attained a seat in the Croatian Parliament. In the 2007 Croatian parliamentary election he retained his seat. His term of office in the Parliament ended in January 2008.

In 2004 he was elected as the president of the Croatian Water Polo Federation, the sport's governing body in Croatia.

In July 2008 Bukić was inducted into the International Swimming Hall of Fame.

His son is Luka Bukić, who is also a water polo player.

See also
 Croatia men's Olympic water polo team records and statistics
 Yugoslavia men's Olympic water polo team records and statistics
 List of Olympic champions in men's water polo
 List of Olympic medalists in water polo (men)
 List of flag bearers for Croatia at the Olympics
 List of world champions in men's water polo
 List of World Aquatics Championships medalists in water polo
 List of members of the International Swimming Hall of Fame

References

External links
 

1966 births
Living people
Sportspeople from Šibenik
Yugoslav male water polo players
Croatian male water polo players
Olympic silver medalists for Croatia in water polo
Olympic water polo players of Yugoslavia
Olympic gold medalists for Yugoslavia
Water polo players at the 1984 Summer Olympics
Water polo players at the 1988 Summer Olympics
Water polo players at the 1996 Summer Olympics
Medalists at the 1996 Summer Olympics
Medalists at the 1988 Summer Olympics
Medalists at the 1984 Summer Olympics
Representatives in the modern Croatian Parliament
Franjo Bučar Award winners
Faculty of Economics and Business, University of Zagreb alumni
Croatian Democratic Union politicians
Croatian sportsperson-politicians
Croatian sports executives and administrators